The Tellus Institute is an American non-profit organization established in 1976 with the aim of bringing scientific rigor and systemic vision to critical environmental and social issues. Tellus has conducted thousands of projects throughout the world, and now focuses on the global future and how to shape it.

Background
The Tellus Institute was founded as a non-profit research organization in 1976 by Paul Raskin and colleagues to conduct research on resource and environmental policy. Initially called Energy Systems Research Group (ESRG), the institute adopted its current name in 1990 to reflect its expanding focus on social-ecological systems from local to global levels (Tellus was the name of the Roman Earth Goddess).

Tellus has partnered with hundreds of organizations, notably the Stockholm Environmental Institute, with which it coordinated programs from 1989 to 2006. The institute has conducted more than 3,500 studies worldwide. The methodology of Tellus projects has been the development of alternative scenarios of the future in order to identify and evaluate alternative paths of action. To that end, the institute developed a widely-used family of scenario planning tools, including the Long range Energy Alternatives Planning system (LEAP), which facilitates energy-environment planning; the Water Evaluation and Planning System (WEAP); and PoleStar, for comprehensive sustainability planning. The aim for the projects is to bring an integrated perspective on issues such as energy, water, sustainable communities, corporate responsibility, and climate change.

Research and programs
The question of the long-range global future theme has increasingly dominated Tellus’s work since the 1980s. In particular, the institute was active in developing integrated approaches and methods for exploring alternative climate change and sustainable development scenarios. Toward that end, Tellus convened the international and interdisciplinary Global Scenario Group to examine global scenarios for the twenty-first century, work that has been relied on in various UN reports and futures studies.

Building on this legacy, the institute has reframed its mission, focusing on research, scholarship, and network-building for advancing a just and sustainable planetary civilization. This “Great Transition” would entail a fundamental shift in human values and the ways we produce, consume, and live. The key is balancing the rights of current generations, future generations, and the wider community of life. Realizing this depends on generating viable, attainable visions of another world, cultivating a sense of global citizenship, and engaging in collective action for systemic change.

The institute’s flagship project is the Great Transition Initiative (GTI), which furthers the critical exploration of concepts, strategies, and visions for a transition to a future of enriched lives, human solidarity, and a resilient biosphere. GTI activities include an online journal of ideas and an international network of more than 1,000 scholars and activists from 50 countries. The aim of the project is to enhance scholarly discourse and public awareness of global challenges, and to build an international community of thinkers and doers concerned with shaping a desirable global transformation.

Further reading
Raskin, Paul, Tariq Banuri, Gilberto Gallopín, Pablo Gutman, Al Hammond, Robert Kates, and Rob Swart. Great Transition: The Promise and Lure of the Times Ahead. Boston: Stockholm Environment Institute, 2002. Available at http://www.greattransition.org/gt-essay.
Gerst, Michael, Paul Raskin, and Johan Rockström. "Contours of a Resilient Global Future." Sustainability 6, no. 1 (2014): 123-135, http://www.mdpi.com/2071-1050/6/1/123. 
Raskin, Paul, Christi Electris, and Rich Rosen. "The Century Ahead: Searching for Sustainability." Sustainability 2, no. 8 (2010): 2626-2651, https://www.mdpi.com/2071-1050/2/8/2626. 
Raskin, Paul, Tariq Banuri, Gilberto Gallopín, Pablo Gutman, Al Hammond, Robert Kates, and Rob Swart. Great Transition: The Promise and Lure of the Times Ahead. Boston: Stockholm Environment Institute, 2002. Available at http://www.greattransition.org/gt-essay.

See also
Sustainable development
Globalization
Global Reporting Initiative
Paul Raskin
Great Transition
Scenario analysis
Global Scenario Group

References

External links
 Tellus Institute
 Great Transition Initiative
 Global Scenario Group
 Corporation 20/20
 Stockholm Environment Institute
 Stockholm Environment Institute-US
 Information on PoleStar sustainability planning software
 Information on WEAP water planning software

Environmental organizations based in Massachusetts
Sustainability organizations
Global economic research
Non-profit organizations based in Boston
Futures studies organizations